Hamud (also Romanized as Ḩamud, Hamood, and Ḩammūd) is a village in Angali Rural District, in the Central District of Bushehr County, Bushehr Province, Iran. At the 2006 census, its population was 84, in 14 families.

References 

Populated places in Bushehr County